The Exo (public transit) Le Richelain sector is the public transportation system for the municipalities of La Prairie, Candiac and Saint-Philippe, which are suburbs lying southeast of Montreal in Quebec, Canada. Originally the communities around Saint-Jean-sur-Richelieu were included but the town now has its own public transit system which serves that area.

Commuter service to Montreal is the major function of the CIT, either directly to the downtown bus terminal via a reserved bus lane on the Champlain Bridge or services to Terminus Longueuil with metro to downtown Montreal.

In 2007, CIT Le Richelain renewed the contract with the Gestrans to provide all management services and renewed its agreement with the carrier La Québécoise for the operation of the buses.

Routes

See also
 Exo bus services

References

External links
 Transit History of Montreal suburbs, Conseil Intermunicipal de Transport (CIT)

Transit agencies in Quebec
Bus transport in Quebec
La Prairie, Quebec
Transport in Roussillon Regional County Municipality